Vision Tower is the name for several buildings under construction including:

Vision Tower (Dubai), also known as The Vision Tower, is an under-construction skyscraper in Dubai
Vision Tower (Tel Aviv), a topped out skyscraper in Tel Aviv

See also
Vision Brisbane, a proposed skyscraper in Brisbane